Triflic acid, the short name for trifluoromethanesulfonic acid, TFMS, TFSA, HOTf or TfOH, is a sulfonic acid with the chemical formula CF3SO3H.  It is one of the strongest known acids. Triflic acid is mainly used in research as a catalyst for esterification. It is a hygroscopic, colorless, slightly viscous liquid and is soluble in polar solvents.

Synthesis
Trifluoromethanesulfonic acid is produced industrially by electrochemical fluorination (ECF) of methanesulfonic acid:
 CH3SO3H + 4 HF ->CF3SO2F + H2O + 3 H2
The resulting CF3SO2F is hydrolyzed, and the resulting triflate salt is reprotonated. Alternatively, trifluoromethanesulfonic acid arises by oxidation of trifluoromethylsulfenyl chloride:
CF3SCl + 2 Cl2 + 3 H2O -> CF3SO3H + 5 HCl

Triflic acid is purified by distillation from triflic anhydride.

Historical
Trifluoromethanesulfonic acid was first synthesized in 1954 by Robert Haszeldine and Kidd by the following reaction:

Reactions

As an acid
In the laboratory, triflic acid is useful in protonations because the conjugate base of triflic acid is nonnucleophilic. It is also used as an acidic titrant in nonaqueous acid-base titration because it behaves as a strong acid in many solvents (acetonitrile, acetic acid, etc.) where common mineral acids (such as HCl or H2SO4) are only moderately strong.

With a Ka = 5×1014, pKa −14.7±2.0, triflic acid qualifies as a superacid. It owes many of its useful properties to its great thermal and chemical stability. Both the acid and its conjugate base CF3SO, known as triflate, resist oxidation/reduction reactions, whereas many strong acids are oxidizing, e.g. perchloric or nitric acid. Further recommending its use, triflic acid does not sulfonate substrates, which can be a problem with sulfuric acid, fluorosulfuric acid, and chlorosulfonic acid. Below is a prototypical sulfonation, which triflic acid does not undergo:
C6H6 + H2SO4 ->[{SO3}] C6H5(SO3H) + H2O

Triflic acid fumes in moist air and forms a stable solid monohydrate, CF3SO3H·H2O, melting point 34 °C.

Salt and complex formation
The triflate ligand is labile, reflecting its low basicity. Trifluoromethanesulfonic acid reacts exothermically with metal carbonates, hydroxides, and oxides. Illustrative is the synthesis of Cu(OTf)2.
Cu2CO3(OH)2 + 4 CF3SO3H -> 2 Cu(O3SCF3)2 + 3 H2O + CO2
Chloride ligands can be converted to the corresponding triflates:
3 CF3SO3H + [Co(NH3)5Cl]Cl2 -> [Co(NH3)5O3SCF3](O3SCF3)2 + 3 HCl
This conversion is conducted in neat HOTf at 100 °C, followed by precipitation of the salt upon the addition of ether.

Organic chemistry
Triflic acid reacts with acyl halides to give mixed triflate anhydrides, which are strong acylating agents, e.g. in Friedel–Crafts reactions.
CH3C(O)Cl + CF3SO3H -> CH3C(O)OSO2CF3 + HCl
CH3C(O)OSO2CF3 + C6H6 -> CH3C(O)C6H5 + CF3SO3H
Triflic acid catalyzes the reaction of aromatic compounds with sulfonyl chlorides, probably also through the intermediacy of a mixed anhydride of the sulfonic acid.

Triflic acid promotes other Friedel–Crafts-like reactions including the cracking of alkanes and alkylation of alkenes, which are very important to the petroleum industry. These triflic acid derivative catalysts are very effective in isomerizing straight chain or slightly branched hydrocarbons that can increase the octane rating of a particular petroleum-based fuel.

Triflic acid reacts exothermically with alcohols to produce ethers and olefins.

Dehydration gives the acid anhydride, trifluoromethanesulfonic anhydride, (CF3SO2)2O.

Safety
Triflic acid is one of the strongest acids. Contact with skin causes severe burns with delayed tissue destruction. On inhalation it causes fatal spasms, inflammation and edema.

Like sulfuric acid, triflic acid must be slowly added to polar solvents to prevent thermal runaway.

References

Inorganic carbon compounds
Reagents for organic chemistry
Superacids
Perfluorosulfonic acids